Hermann Köhl (15 April 1888 – 7 October 1938) was a German aviation pioneer and pilot of the first transatlantic flight by a fixed-wing aircraft from east to west.

Biography
Köhl was born in Neu-Ulm, Bavaria, as one of eight children. At the age of 19, he joined the German Imperial Army to become an officer like his father. At the beginning of World War I he was a Lieutenant in the Württembergisches Pionier-Bataillon Nr.13 ("13th Württemberg Pioneer Battalion"). After being wounded in the legs, which disqualified him for further service in the engineers, he volunteered to join the German Army Air Service. He became a pilot and later a commander of a Bomber Squadron, and received the Pour le Mérite in 1918. He crashed his aircraft behind enemy lines and was captured and held as a POW in France but managed to escape and returned to Germany.

After the end of World War I, he worked for the German Police and for the Reichswehr, but in 1925, he transferred to civil aviation and became the head of the Deutsche Luft Hansa Nightflight Branch in 1926.

Transatlantic flight

After Charles Lindbergh crossed the Atlantic from west to east in May 1927, the idea of flying in the opposite direction, which is more difficult because of the prevailing winds, became more and more popular. His plans were supported by Hugo Junkers. After performing some test flights and breaking the record for flight duration, Hünefeld and Köhl flew to Baldonnel, Ireland, where they met James C. Fitzmaurice, the Irish Air Corps Commandant of the Baldonnel Aerodrome. On 12 April 1928, these three left Baldonnel in the Bremen and crossed the Atlantic Ocean, landing at Greenly Island on the south coast of Labrador, Canada. Even though they missed their intended destination, New York City, they were the first to cross the Atlantic by fixed-wing aircraft from Europe to America, almost nine years after the initial success at an east-west crossing by a British rigid airship.

For his feat, Köhl was awarded the Distinguished Flying Cross by Calvin Coolidge, the President of the United States.

In 1935, Köhl lost his job with Luft Hansa. As a devout Catholic and a man of strong character, he then retired to a small farm in the south of Germany, rather than curry favour with the National Socialists.

Köhl died in Munich in 1938 from a kidney disease that he had contracted during his flights. He was buried in Pfaffenhofen an der Roth.

Tributes
A German Luftwaffe Airbus A310 MRTT medevac aircraft and the Bundeswehr barracks of the Transporthubschrauber-Regiment 30 in Niederstetten are named after Hermann Köhl. There is also a street in Bremen, near the airport, that is named after him.

A street in Massapequa Park, a suburb on Long Island, New York, is named after Köhl. The street was once home to Fitzmaurice Flying Park.

References

Literature

External links
 

1888 births
1938 deaths
People from Neu-Ulm
Recipients of the Pour le Mérite (military class)
German World War I flying aces
Luftstreitkräfte personnel
Aviation pioneers
People from the Kingdom of Bavaria
Roman Catholics in the German Resistance
World War I prisoners of war held by France
Recipients of the Distinguished Flying Cross (United States)
German prisoners of war in World War I
German escapees
Escapees from French detention
Military personnel of Württemberg
Transatlantic flight
German aviation record holders
Lufthansa people
Deaths from kidney disease
German Army personnel of World War I